The following is a list of the islands of Guatemala.

Bahia de Amatique
Several very small islands

Pacific Ocean
Several very small islands

Inland islands
El Golfete
Cayo Julio
Cayo Grande
Cayo Palomo
Cuatro Cayos
Lake Yaxhá
Canté
Paxté
Topoxte
 Lake Petén Itzá
 Flores

See also
Geography of Guatemala

References

External links

World island information @ WorldIslandInfo.com

Islands